Walter Fabricio Soto Pineda (born December 22, 1983) is a Salvadoran footballer who is currently contracted to Águila in the Primera División de Fútbol de El Salvador.

Club career
Nicknamed Chuperto, Soto started his career at Third Division side España before joining premier division club Vista Hermosa in 2006. He then had spells in the Salvadoran second division with ADI and Liberal, either side of a stint at San Salvador F.C. in the 2008 Apertura Season. He returned to the top tier with Municipal Limeño and rejoined Vista Hermosa in 2010.

In January 2012, Soto signed a two-year contract with Águila nut was denied to play in the 2012 Clausura since he requested to leave Vista Hermosa after not being paid but was not registered in time by Águila.

International career
Soto made his debut for El Salvador in a November 2011 FIFA World Cup qualification match against Suriname, coming on as a late substitute for Léster Blanco. As of February 2012, it still is his only international game.

References

External links
 
 Niegan inscripción a delantero Walter Soto con Club Deportivo Águila (including bio) - El Salvador Noticias 

1983 births
Living people
People from San Miguel, El Salvador
Association football forwards
Salvadoran footballers
El Salvador international footballers
C.D. Vista Hermosa footballers
San Salvador F.C. footballers